{{DISPLAYTITLE:C5H11NO2S}}
The molecular formula C5H11NO2S (molar mass: 149.21 g/mol, exact mass: 149.0510 u) may refer to:

 Methionine, an essential amino acid in humans
 Penicillamine, a medication